Saint-Derrien is a commune in the Finistère department of Brittany in north-western France.

See also
Communes of the Finistère department

References

Mayors of Finistère Association 

Communes of Finistère